Tudor Owen may refer to:

Tudor Owen (actor) (1898–1979), Welsh actor
Tudor Owen (judge) (born 1951), British judge

See also

Owen Tudor (disambiguation)
Owen (name)